Mycoplasma bovis is one of 126 species of genus Mycoplasma. It is the smallest living cell and anaerobic organism in nature. It does not contain any cell wall and is therefore resistant to penicillin and other beta lactam antibiotics.

Mycoplasma bovis mainly affects cattle and has little effect on other production animals. It does not affect horses and or pet animals, but other animals can be carriers for Mycoplasma bovis. Wyoming Game and Fish is reporting that the North American pronghorn is now affected by the disease with very high mortality. Mycoplasma bovis causes a constellation of diseases, including mastitis in dairy cows, arthritis in cows and calves, pneumonia in calves, and various other diseases likely including late-term abortion. Not all infected cows get sick – some shed the disease without becoming ill, allowing for transmission between farms if apparently healthy cows are moved.

Signs and symptoms

Mastitis

Mastitis can cause a decline in potassium and lactoferrin. It also results in decreased casein, the major protein in milk. As most calcium in milk is associated with casein, the disruption of casein synthesis contributes to lowered calcium in milk. The milk protein continues to undergo further deterioration during processing and storage. Milk from cows with mastitis also has a higher somatic cell count. Generally speaking, the higher the somatic cell count, the lower the milk quality.

Bovine respiratory disease

In early bovine respiratory disease (BRD) cases, the lungs and airways are generally painful, so the animal will try to clear the airway with mild, tentative, soft coughing.
 Depression
 Lack of appetite
 Dullness
 Respiratory signs:
 Rapid, shallow breathing
 Coughing

Arthritis
Cattle effected by arthritis have difficulty in moving, including getting up and swelling in joints. Some outbreaks have many lame calves while others have no effected calves. Some calves have swollen joints that are so painful that they will be reluctant to walk to the feed and water bunks. In rare cases calves can have spinal issues, tiredness, irritability, muscle atrophy, licking, chewing and biting.

Prevention
There are many ways by which cattle can be prevented from catching Mycoplasma bovis and other pathogenic bacteria.

Transport of animals
Animal transport vehicles should be cleaned with disinfectants before and after use. Environmental swabs should be taken and samples sent to a microbiology lab. If any harmful bacteria are detected, further action should be taken.

Visitors
Only authorized people should be allowed to visit a farm. Visitors should arrive with clean clothing and footwear. Disinfectant on arrival and departure can reduce the spread of bacteria. For example, a water mat with disinfectant can be used in the entrance of the farm.

Weekly inspection and maintenance
Weekly cleaning of all the areas and equipment reduces the chances of animals getting sick. Also, it is important to clean the feedlot container and keep the feed dry. Doubling the boundary fence with a 6-inch gap prevents the animals contacting neighbouring animals.

Diagnostics
Mycoplasma bovis can be analyzed with culture, PCR (polymerase chain reaction) or serology. It is difficult to culture because of slow growing and special agar is needed. Therefore PCR is most commonly used and also serology. A collaboration between six different European laboratories (CoVetLab) showed that the different in-house PCR that were used worked well A European interlaboratory trial to evaluate the performance of different PCR methods for Mycoplasma bovis diagnosis

The CoVetLab project also evaluated three different serological methods and found that two of them were performing well A European inter-laboratory trial to evaluate the performance of three serological methods for diagnosis of Mycoplasma bovis infection in cattle using latent class analysis

History and taxonomy
Mycoplasma bovis was first isolated in the United States from the milk of a mastitic cow in 1961. It was initially described as Mycoplasma agalactia var bovis by Hale and colleagues, on the basis of biochemical reactions and its association with bovine mastitis. Later work, based on serological responses  and DNA homology studies confirmed that the new Mycoplasma was a different species and renamed it Mycoplasma bovis 

As of June 2017, only two OECD nations (New Zealand and Norway) were considered to be free of Mycoplasma bovis, but in July 2017 some cattle near Oamaru, New Zealand were found to be Mycoplasma bovis positive; see 2017 Mycoplasma bovis outbreak.

Loss to economy
There are only estimated economic losses in two continents due to Mycoplasma bovis. The estimated loss in Europe due to Mycoplasma bovis is approximately €576 million per year. The total loss in the United States is estimated to be $108 million. US losses due to mastitis, lack of the weight gain and diminished carcass value are valued at $32 million. It is very  expensive for the government and the farmers to control Mycoplasma bovis. Also, it affects the production of milk and the cost for treatment is high. Because cows are the main source of income to most of the farmers, many governments have to reimburse the farmers for loss of income and stock value, which affects the economy.

Treatment
Mycoplasma species have unusual characteristics for bacteria. Unlike other bacteria they can live in cultures outside cells and they lack a cell wall. Some antibiotics work by damaging cell walls so these do not work on Mycoplasma species. However, they can be killed by antibiotics such as tetracyclines, macrolides or erythromycin which do not act on the cell wall. Draxxin (Tulathromycin) and Resflor Gold  are the only drugs approved for treating Mycoplasma bovis in cattle but Florfenicol (Nuflor) and Batril can also be used. The normal duration of the treatment is 10–14 days by antibiotic therapy.

Vaccination
Several vaccines are available: Pulmo-GuardMpB, Mycomune Mycoplasma Bovis bacterin, and Myco-BacTM B.

References

Further reading
 Mycoplasma bovis MPI New Zealand

External links
Type strain of Mycoplasma bovis at BacDive -  the Bacterial Diversity Metadatabase

Bovine diseases
bovis